In mathematics, Bendixson's inequality is a quantitative result in the field of matrices derived by Ivar Bendixson in 1902. The inequality puts limits on the imaginary and real parts of characteristic roots (eigenvalues) of real matrices. A special case of this inequality leads to the result that characteristic roots of a real symmetric matrix are always real.

The inequality relating to the imaginary parts of characteristic roots of real matrices (Theorem I in ) is stated as:

 

If  is symmetric then  and consequently the inequality implies that  must be real.

The inequality relating to the real parts of characteristic roots of real matrices (Theorem II in ) is stated as:

.

See also
 Gershgorin circle theorem

References

Abstract algebra
Linear algebra
Matrix theory